The men's 5000 metre relay in short track speed skating at the 2010 Winter Olympics began on 17 February, and ended on 26 February at the Pacific Coliseum.

Results

Semifinals

Finals

Final B (classification round)

Final A (medal round)

External links
 2010 Winter Olympics results: Men's 5000 m Relay (heats), from http://www.vancouver2010.com/; retrieved 2010-02-25.
 2010 Winter Olympics results: Men's 5000 m Relay (finals), from http://www.vancouver2010.com/; retrieved 2010-02-25.

Men's short track speed skating at the 2010 Winter Olympics